David Lamont Denson (born January 17, 1995) is an American former professional baseball first baseman and outfielder. He played in Minor League Baseball (MiLB) for the Milwaukee Brewers organization. In 2015, Denson became the first active player affiliated with a Major League Baseball organization to publicly come out as gay.

Career
Denson attended Bishop Amat High School in La Puente, California, for his freshman year, and then transferred as sophomore to South Hills High School in West Covina, California. He committed to play college baseball for the Hawaii Rainbow Warriors. As a high school senior in December 2012, Denson hit a  home run (HR) in an annual amateur home run derby, topping the  record of Bryce Harper from 2009. A YouTube video of his record homer went viral, drawing over one million viewers. Denson played high school baseball in 2013 for the first time since his freshman year, though he had been competing for the ABD Academy, a baseball academy in San Bernardino. He was a Sierra League first-team selection after leading South Hills to a league championship while batting .446 with seven HRs, 11 doubles, two triples and 27 runs batted in (RBIs).

The Milwaukee Brewers selected him in the 15th round of the 2013 MLB Draft. Wary of being ineligible for the draft for another three years if chose to play for Hawaii, Denson opted instead to play professionally, signing with Milwaukee for $100,000. He played for the Wisconsin Timber Rattlers of the Class A Midwest League for most of 2014, where he had a .243 batting average with four home runs and 29 RBIs in 68 games. He began the 2015 season with Wisconsin, and after batting .195 with one home run and eight RBIs in 24 games, he was demoted to the Helena Brewers of the Rookie-level Pioneer League. With Helena, Denson was selected to play in the Northwest–Pioneer League All-Star Game, where he was honored as the MiLB.com Top Star for the Pioneer League after hitting a pinch hit home run while going 2-for-3 along with two RBIs and two runs scored. In late August, the Brewers promoted Denson back to Wisconsin.

After playing primarily as a first baseman through the 2015 season, Denson became an outfielder for the 2016 season. He began the 2016 season with Wisconsin, and was promoted to the Brevard County Manatees of the Class A-Advanced Florida State League. During spring training in 2017, Denson announced his retirement from professional baseball.

Personal life
Denson's father, Lamont, is a former athlete. His sister, Celestine, is a professional dancer.

During the 2015 season, while playing for Helena, Denson came out as gay to his teammates. In August 2015, with the help of Billy Bean, Major League Baseball's (MLB) Ambassador for Inclusion, Denson contacted the Milwaukee Journal Sentinel so that he could come out publicly. Denson became the first active player within a Major League Baseball organization to come out to the public. He was also the second active pro baseball player to have come out.

See also
List of LGBT sportspeople

Notes

References

External links

1995 births
Living people
People from La Puente, California
Baseball players from California
Baseball first basemen
Baseball outfielders
Arizona League Brewers players
Wisconsin Timber Rattlers players
Helena Brewers players
American LGBT sportspeople
LGBT people from California
LGBT baseball players
Gay sportsmen
American sportsmen
Brevard County Manatees players
Minor league baseball players
21st-century LGBT people